This article contains information about the literary events and publications of 1557.

Events
May 4 – The Stationers' Company in the City of London, a printers' guild, receives a Royal Charter.
June 5 – The London publisher Richard Tottel produces Tottel's Miscellany ,the first printed anthology of English poetry, edited by himself and including first publication of original poems by Henry Howard, Earl of Surrey (beheaded 1547) and Sir Thomas Wyatt (died 1542)
June 10 – The New Testament of the Geneva Bible, a Protestant Bible translation into English, supervised by William Whittingham and printed in Roman type, is published in Geneva.

New books

Prose
Thomas North – The Diall of Princes (translation from French version of Antonio de Guevara's Reloj de Principes, chiefly from Marcus Aurelius's Meditations)
Robert Recorde – The Whetstone of Witte
Hans Staden –  (True history and description of wild, ferocious man-eaters in the New World of America)
, a version of The Three Princes of Serendip published by Michele Tramezzino, allegedly after an Italian translation by Cristoforo Armeno

Drama
Lodovico Dolce – Medea

Poetry

Giovanni Battista Giraldi – Ercole
Tottel's Miscellany

Births
February 15 – Alfonso Fontanelli, Italian composer and writer (died 1622)
Unknown date – Jean de Sponde, Basque French poet (died 1595)

Deaths
April 9 – Mikael Agricola, Finnish scholar (born c. 1510)
August 1 – Olaus Magnus, Swedish ecclesiastic and writer (born 1490)
September 13 – John Cheke, English classical scholar and statesman (born 1514)
October 20 – Jean Salmon Macrin, French poet (born 1490)
Unknown dates
Gonzalo Fernández de Oviedo y Valdés, Spanish historian (born 1478 in literature)
Nicolas de Herberay des Essarts, French translator (birth year unknown)

References

Years of the 16th century in literature